60 Hudson Street, formerly known as the Western Union Building, is a 24-story telecommunications building in the Tribeca neighborhood of Manhattan in New York City. Built in 1928–1930, it was one of several Art Deco-style buildings designed by Ralph Thomas Walker of Voorhees, Gmelin and Walker for telecommunications in the early 20th century. 60 Hudson Street spans the entire block between Hudson Street, Thomas Street, Worth Street, and West Broadway.

Its design shows the influence of Dutch and German Expressionism, with Art Deco detailing. The building's shape features asymmetrical massing and numerous setbacks. The brick facade uses a gradient color scheme with nineteen distinct hues, moving from darker shades to lighter ones as the building rises, and several ornate entrances at ground level lead to a barrel-vaulted brick lobby. 

60 Hudson Street was initially the headquarters of Western Union, and its construction was commissioned by Western Union president Newcomb Carlton. The building was described as the world's largest telegraph building upon its opening and served as the combined headquarters for all of Western Union's divisions, which were scattered across New York City prior to the building's completion.  Though Western Union relocated elsewhere in 1973, its former headquarters remains a communications center, and since the late 20th century, has housed a colocation center, making it one of the most important Internet hubs in the world. The exterior and lobby were designated as official New York City landmarks in 1991.

Architecture 
The Worth and Thomas Street elevations are parallel to each other and perpendicular to the West Broadway elevation. The Hudson Street elevation runs diagonally, intersecting both Worth and Thomas Streets.

The building was designed by Ralph Walker of Voorhees, Gmelin and Walker in the Art Deco style. 60 Hudson Street was the third Art Deco building in the New York City area that Walker designed, after the Barclay–Vesey Building (1927) and New Jersey Bell Headquarters Building (1929); it was followed by 1 Wall Street (1931) and 32 Avenue of the Americas (1932), as well as telephone buildings in Upstate New York. Within the New York City area, McKenzie, Voorhees & Gmelin designed numerous other buildings for AT&T or its affiliates during the same time span. 60 Hudson Street was one of several technologically advanced headquarters erected in the mid-20th century for communications and utility companies in the U.S. Unlike the AT&T buildings, 60 Hudson Street lacks a unified iconography in its ornamentation.

Form 

The massing of 60 Hudson Street includes numerous setbacks. Though setbacks in New York City skyscrapers were mandated by the 1916 Zoning Resolution in order to allow light and air to reach the streets below, they later became a defining feature of the Art Deco style. 60 Hudson Street's massing mostly uses rectangular shapes in spite of its trapezoid-shaped lot. This may have been a response to architecture critic Lewis Mumford's previous criticism of the Barclay–Vesey Building's transition from a parallelogram shaped base to a right-angled tower, which he regarded as an "annoying defect". Walker subsequently wrote that Mumford's criticism made him realize "a building could take its own form regardless of the land below". Accordingly, Walker designed 60 Hudson Street as an intricate set of interlocking slabs, which architectural writer Robert A. M. Stern described as fulfilling "Hugh Ferriss's poetic conceit of the tall building as a manmade mountain". 

On the Hudson Street elevation is a two-story screen, behind which rise three rectangular slabs. The northern, center, and southern slabs are respectively 15, 21, and 19 stories tall.  By contrast, the West Broadway elevation, which is perpendicular to both Thomas and Worth Streets, is symmetrical, with the top floors behind a central slab. Along the outer sections of the West Broadway elevation, the setbacks are at the 13th, 15th, 19th, and 22nd stories; the center section contains projecting dormers that rise an additional story above the previous setback, except at the 22nd floor. The series of setbacks on Thomas and Worth Streets are largely symmetrical, and are continuations of the setbacks on the outer edges of the West Broadway elevation. There are several projecting dormers along the setbacks near the western (Hudson Street) ends of both elevations.

60 Hudson Street's form was also influenced by its interior use, as it was a "hybrid building" that contained offices along with mechanical equipment. There were numerous functions that did not necessitate sunlight and could operate using artificial light, such as the central operating system and the mechanical space, which was placed inside the building's core. The office space, conversely, was placed on the exterior walls, so 60 Hudson Street did not require light courts that were as extensive as in nearby buildings.

Facade 
A brick facade was used for 60 Hudson Street and for Walker's other communications buildings, since he preferred the material for its texture and its flexibility in color combinations. The brick ornamentation on the facade was concentrated around the base, as well as on the parapets on each setback (which were largely removed by the 1990s). The use of brick was likely influenced by Dutch and German Expressionism, as well as Walker's preference for "unity and harmony", his dislike of terracotta-on-brick ornamentation, and his observation that stone could change color within a short time. The brick was made by the Continental Clay Products Company of Fallston, Pennsylvania, which also made the facade for the David Stott Building in Detroit, Michigan. Walker also designed the facade with a grid of accented vertical piers, contrasting with horizontal spandrels. This emphasized the vertical lines of the building and, when combined with the setbacks, created an appearance of cascades. 

The bricks were tinted in various tones of red, arranged in a gradient, inspired by Louis Sullivan's use of "tapestry brick" in different hues. 60 Hudson Street was one of the first structures to use bricks in this manner. According to Walker, this was inspired by Western Union's inclination toward using a distinctive design for the building. There are 19 shades of brick used in the building. Each shade was created by baking the bricks in a kiln run under varying circumstances. The darkest bricks were used in the base, and the bricks on upper stories contained progressively lighter hues. To create contrasts in the facade, the base also contained some light bricks and the upper stories also had some dark bricks. Though the facade mostly used brick in red and yellow hues, there were also bricks in very dark blue and purple hues. The facade served to give emphasis to the building's shape: the 1939 WPA Guide to New York City observed that 60 Hudson Street resembled "a huge red rock projecting out of the city". Stern wrote that 60 Hudson Street's decoration was "rather integral" to the brick facade, as opposed to at the Barclay–Vesey Building, which contained decorative elements and a facade in "contradiction" to each other.

Base 

The base comprises the first two stories. The lowest section of the facade is composed of three courses of pink granite, while the brick facade rises above that. Around the doors and windows, the brickwork is arranged similarly to curtains. The base is also divided vertically by stepped brick piers. The critic Paul T. Frankl stated that designs like that of 60 Hudson Street were effective, comparing them to "brick tapestries hung from the sky". Most ornamentation is made of brick, though the friezes, window frames, and doorways are made of bronze.

On the Hudson Street elevation, the facade forms a two-story "screen", behind which rise the upper stories. The main entrance archway is in the center of this "screen", near the intersection with Jay Street. It consists of five bronze doors beneath a bronze lintel, as well as a glazed window above the doors, which is subdivided by diagonal muntins. The other archways on Hudson Street include storefronts on the ground level, and curtain-shaped windows with vertical muntins on the second story. A smaller doorway faces the corner of Hudson and Worth Streets, on the northwest side of the plot.

The West Broadway elevation is designed similarly to the "screen" on the Hudson Street elevation. There is a centrally positioned entrance with five doors, a bronze lintel, and a glazed window with diagonal muntins. Three storefronts are on either side of the doorway on West Broadway; at the second story, two of these storefronts contain curtain-shaped windows, and the third contains a pair of sash windows set between vertical brick piers. On the Worth Street elevation, there are storefront windows at either end. The central section of the Worth Street elevation contains triple-hung windows, which concealed an auditorium inside. On Thomas Street, there are two storefront windows on the easternmost bays, as well as two double-height loading docks. The remaining bays on Thomas Street contain rectangular windows or ventilation grates, which are set between brick piers.

Upper stories 
The rest of 60 Hudson Street's facade is modeled in a mostly consistent format. On Hudson Street, Walker designed the facade with a pattern of wide and narrow piers that alternate. On the other elevations, the piers were largely flat against the rest of the facade, except behind the setbacks at the upper levels, where the piers were more prominent and designed similar to buttresses. At several locations on the north and south elevations, there were windowless bays that concealed stairways behind them. On the Worth Street elevation, the center window openings on the third floor are filled with copper chevron-shaped louvers.

Interior 
When he designed the Barclay-Vesey Building, Walker had believed that it should serve "as a machine which had definite functions to perform for the benefit of its occupants." In a similar manner, 60 Hudson Street was described as "housing the production of the service which this company renders". As with his previous commissions, Walker designed the interior in a similar style to the exterior, at a time when many buildings were being designed with modern-styled exteriors and historically-styled interiors. In contrast to the complex stone designs of his previous commissions, the ornamental program at 60 Hudson Street is more subdued and exclusively uses brick. The interior spaces of 60 Hudson Street cover almost .

Lobby 
The corridor contains a barrel-vaulted brick ceiling. Extending off this corridor are two elevator banks, one on each side, as well as numerous additional doorways to service areas, stairwells, and the storefronts at each of the building's four corners. Also on the south side are a telephone alcove; an entrance to the lobby outside the building's former auditorium; and a passageway to the former cafeteria, Small vestibules separate the main corridor from Hudson Street and West Broadway. On Hudson Street, between the vestibule and the main hall, is a wide entrance hall. This space contains plaster on the upper portions of its walls, as well as an arched ceiling supported by octagonal brick piers.

Unlike most other Art Deco lobbies of the time, which incorporated traditional motifs with modern materials, 60 Hudson Street's lobby largely uses a modern brick design. The lobby is clad largely in brick and tile, though the floors are made of terrazzo tile and the bottoms of the walls are clad with red granite. A Western Union publication described the lobby as the "only all-brick corridor in any office building in America". Many elements of the facade were also used in the lobby, such as the brick reliefs and chevrons; curtain-shaped thresholds and doorways; use of bronze trim; and the mailboxes and doors, which are designed in a style reminiscent of the exterior setbacks. The use of interior brick is inspired not only by Sullivan's "brick tapestries" but also by designs of brick halls created by Peter Behrens, Barry Byrne, and Peder Vilhelm Jensen-Klint.

The tops of the walls contain curved covings, giving the appearance that the walls and ceilings have been blended. The lobby contains bronze and brick furnishings such as lampposts and signage. The lobby is illuminated almost entirely by sconces that provide indirect light.

Other interior spaces 
The second floor contained a gymnasium, a library, and a school for the education of messengers, while the upper floors contained mechanical shops, offices, and equipment rooms. The ninth floor included laboratories for the company, and the 24th floor served as a "presidential suite". The eleventh through fifteenth floors were devoted to facilities for Western Union's different modes of communication: simplex printers, multiplex transmitters, marine and stock ticker tapes, Morse code equipment, and telephone equipment. Four additional floors were set aside for the possible future expansion of these facilities. This reinforced 60 Hudson Street's role as "the heart of a nerve system of wires and cables reaching to every corner of the nation and the world."

Pneumatic tubes led from 60 Hudson Street to twenty-five branch offices in Lower and Midtown Manhattan, allowing for the easy transport of pneumatic tube mail in the city. Some of these tubes were later repurposed to hold cables for the Internet companies that occupied the building.

History

Context and planning 

Western Union, founded in 1851, became a major provider of telegraph services in the late 19th century. In 1875, it built the Western Union Telegraph Building at 195 Broadway between Dey Street and Fulton Street. Western Union was acquired by AT&T in 1909, and the next year, AT&T revealed plans to improve Western Union's offices "for the accommodation of the public and the welfare" of workers. William W. Bosworth was commissioned to design a new headquarters on the same site, the present 195 Broadway, which was completed in 1916. The newer Broadway building came to be mainly associated with AT&T, to the extent that by the 1920s, Western Union did not have a building with which its headquarters was mainly associated. Simultaneously, work proceeded on 24 Walker Street, a shared-operations building erected five blocks north on the current 32 Avenue of the Americas site in 1911–1914.

AT&T, under indictment of the Sherman Act, sold its shares in Western Union in 1913 due to the threat of antitrust action. Under the tenure of Western Union president Newcomb Carlton, the company's operations grew and its equipment was upgraded to modern standards.

Construction 
Western Union began land acquisition at the site of 60 Hudson Street in 1924, ultimately buying up the whole block between Worth, Hudson, and Thomas Streets and West Broadway. The site was close to 24 Walker Street, as well as the company's major clients in Lower Manhattan: the American Stock Exchange at their Trinity Place building, the New York Cotton Exchange, the New York Produce Exchange, and the ticker service on Wall Street. It was projected that the Western Union Building's completion would raise land values along Worth Street.

In May 1928, Western Union filed construction plans for the Hudson Street site. Work started in August 1928, and excavations started the following month. At the time of the site's official groundbreaking, the building was expected to be completed in January 1930. Construction was to take two years because of the complexities of the project: the building was required to be fireproof and resistant to theft and outside interference, while the cable and conduit systems were supposed to handle 100 million messages yearly.

Western Union years 
Western Union started moving from 195 Broadway in August 1930. Two months later, on October 5, the telegraph lines from 24 Walker Street were "cut over" to 60 Hudson Street, with the help of 3,000 men. Telegraph service was maintained throughout the twelve-hour "cut over" period; this was considered a large engineering achievement for the time. Just before the building's opening, Carlton protested against plans to demolish the adjacent Sixth Avenue elevated railroad in preparation for the construction of nearby subway lines, stating that it would inconvenience Western Union employees; the line ultimately remained open until 1938.

The Western Union Building was a premier nexus of worldwide communications during the heyday of the telegraph and was called the "Telegraph Capitol of America". When 60 Hudson Street was Western Union's headquarters, equipment for communications was installed on the roof. The equipment was frequently updated to use the most modern technology, making the building desirable to communications companies. In 1948, Western Union sold 60 Hudson Street to a Chicago-based company for $12.5 million, subsequently leasing back the structure. The proceeds from the sale would be used to pay back long-term debt and pay for modernization of the company's equipment.

Western Union moved its headquarters to Upper Saddle River, New Jersey, in 1973, though it continued to occupy much of 60 Hudson Street until 1983, when a second sublease was made. Afterward, Western Union gradually moved out of its space. 60 Hudson Street remained a major telecommunications hub, as the wires of six long-distance communications providers converged under the building.

Internet hub and offices 

After Western Union left, 60 Hudson Street was converted into a colocation center and grew into one of the most important internet hubs in the world. Hundreds of telecommunications companies interconnect their respective internet networks (known as peering) as well as conventional TDM traffic through numerous meet-me rooms and optical and electrical lines placed throughout the building.  Many data center colocation providers are tenants in the building. Epsilon Telecommunications, one such company, has built optical and electrical cabling facilities throughout the building since 1997. Various data centers including Epsilon, Digital Realty, and DataBank house internet and telecommunications providers for the purpose of collocating high capacity transport equipment used to terminate traffic both inbound and outbound with each other. The exteriors and ground-floor lobbies of 60 Hudson Street and two other telecommunications buildings were designated city landmarks by the New York City Landmarks Preservation Commission in 1991.

In addition, after Western Union moved out of 60 Hudson Street, some of the space was occupied by city and state agencies. This included the New York City Department of Correction, which moved there in 2002. However, this use was relatively short-lived, as the city's departments of buildings and correction left 60 Hudson Street in 2010, and the space was subsequently used by internet providers.

There has been some controversy about the usage of 60 Hudson Street as a colocation building. Residents of the surrounding neighborhood complained in 1999 that the cooling structures on the building were too loud. 60 Hudson Street's then-owners, Hudson Telegraph Associates, agreed to mitigate noise coming from the building. In 2006, a New York City panel approved the storage of nearly 2,000 gallons (7,500 liters) of diesel fuel on six floors of the building, part of some 80,000 gallons (300,000 liters) of fuel oil stored in the building. Community opposition had been raised regarding concerns that the presence of the fuel oil posed a fire hazard that could result in a catastrophic failure of the building. 60 Hudson Street underwent some renovations starting in 2015. Cordiant Digital Infrastructure announced in early 2022 that it would acquire the building's owner, DataGryd, whose sole property was 60 Hudson Street.

See also

 Art Deco architecture of New York City
 List of New York City Designated Landmarks in Manhattan below 14th Street
 111 Eighth Avenue

References

Notes

Citations

Sources

External links 

 

Art Deco architecture in Manhattan
Art Deco skyscrapers
Infrastructure completed in 1930
Internet in the United States
New York City Designated Landmarks in Manhattan
New York City interior landmarks
Office buildings completed in 1930
Skyscrapers in Manhattan
Telecommunications buildings in the United States
Telephone exchange buildings
Tribeca
Western Union buildings and structures
1930 establishments in New York City